A general election was held in the U.S. state of New Hampshire on November 3, 2020.

To vote by mail, registered New Hampshire voters must request a ballot by November 2, 2020. As of early October, some 163,974 voters have requested mail ballots. Received ballots will be processed beginning on October 29, 2020.

State offices

Executive
 2020 New Hampshire gubernatorial election
 2020 New Hampshire Executive Council election

Legislative
 2020 New Hampshire Senate election
 2020 New Hampshire House of Representatives election

Federal offices

Executive
 2020 United States presidential election in New Hampshire

Legislative
 2020 United States Senate election in New Hampshire
 2020 United States House of Representatives elections in New Hampshire

See also
 Elections in New Hampshire
 Politics of New Hampshire
 Political party strength in New Hampshire

References

External links
  (State affiliate of the U.S. League of Women Voters)
 
 
 
 

 
New Hampshire